Web User, branded as WebUser, was a fortnightly magazine published in the United Kingdom from 2001 until 2020. It covered topics relating to computing. Its sister magazine was ComputerActive.

Overview
Web User was founded by IPC Media in 2001. The first issue appeared on 22 March. The bulk of the magazine's content consisted of internet news, website reviews and features on web-related topics. It also featured product reviews, free software, free apps, step-by-step workshops, and hints and tips for using computer software, hardware, and websites. The magazine was complemented by a website, launched in tandem in 2001. It was sold in 2010 to Dennis Publishing. It ceased publication after 516 issues in December 2020.

Topics covered include free software; PC security and maintenance; browser add-ons; the best Google tools; and the latest web trends and developments, such as Web 2.0 and social networking.

References

External links

Biweekly magazines published in the United Kingdom
Defunct computer magazines published in the United Kingdom
Magazines established in 2001
Magazines disestablished in 2020
Magazines published in London
2001 establishments in England
2020 disestablishments in England